Jerseys symbolising race positions include the yellow jersey, or maillot jaune, from the Tour de France, the pink jersey, or maglia rosa, from the Giro d'Italia, and the red jersey, or la roja, from the Vuelta a España. The first two jerseys were given the same color as the paper their original main sponsors (both sports newspapers)  were printed on: yellow and pink paper, respectively. The overall leader at the Vuelta at present wears a red jersey, although previously it has been the "maillot amarillo" (yellow jersey) and the "jersey de oro" (golden jersey). Many other jerseys are colored or designed after a sponsor's logo, and some jerseys change color when a new sponsor is found.

Overview of jerseys

Grand Tour races

Women's Grand Tour races

UCI World Tour (stage) races

UCI ProSeries (stage) races

UCI Continental Tour (stage) races

UCI Europe Tour

UCI Asia Tour

Former Stage races

Championship Jerseys

See also 
Cycling jersey

References